Anandham Vilayadum Veedu is a 2021 Indian Tamil-language action drama film written and directed by Nandha Periyasamy and produced by Sri Vaari Film. The film stars Gautham Karthik, Cheran and Shivathmika Rajasekhar with a supporting cast including Saravanan, Vignesh, Daniel Balaji, Rajendran and Soundararaja. The film was released in theatres on 24 December 2021.

Plot 

Periya Aambalai (Joe Malloori) plays an elderly man who has four children, Kasi (Saravanan), Pazhanisamy (Vignesh), Dharmaraj (Snehan) and a daughter with his deceased first wife. Muthupandi (Cheran), Chella, Selvam (Soundararaja) and Mahesh are his sons with his second wife. Kasi has two children, Sakthivel (Gautham Karthik) and Venpa. Muthupandi is very affectionate towards his half brother Kasi and also employs his nephew Sakthivel in his lorry business. Karuppan(Daniel Balaji) is an evil money lender who loses his business due the brothers working hard, helping one another and waits for an opportunity to destroy them. When Venba gets pregnant after marriage Kasi decides to have the childbirth in their home but since its in a bad shape he decides to build a new house. Muthupandi offers his land to Kasi who in return promises to build a house for the entire family of thirty members. The construction begins and Karuppan starts plotting against them and creates rifts between the half brothers.

Cast

Production
In November 2020, it was reported that filmmaker Nandha Periyasamy was planning to make Mayandi Kudumbathar 2, a spiritual sequel to the film Mayandi Kudumbathar (2009), with Gautham Karthik in the lead role. The pair subsequently collaborated for a separate family drama through Anandham Vilayadum Veedu.

Soundtrack 

The soundtrack and score is composed by Siddhu Kumar and the album featured four songs.

Release

Theatrical 
The film was released in theatres on 24 December 2021 and opened to mixed reviews from critics.

Home media 
The post-theatrical streaming rights of the film was bought by ZEE5 and the satellite rights of the film was bought by Zee Tamil and Zee Thirai.

Reception 
Ram Venkat Srikar of Cinema Express rated the film with 2.5/5 stars, stating that, "When we walk into the film, we know what we are walking into and that’s exactly what we get. Beneath the flaws, the melodrama, a host of squawking characters, there’s some heart to be found in this family drama, but it needed more. In other words, the foundation is strong enough, but it needed a stronger build." Suganth of The Times of India gave a rating of 2 out on 5 and wrote, "A family drama with contrived writing and TV serial-level making." Sify rated the film with 2/5 stars, criticizing that, "Anandham Vilayadum Veedu is for audiences who love TV serials and family dramas from the 80s." and gave the final verdict as Below Average. Bharat Kumar of News Today wrote, "The film is cringe at places and fails to leave an emotional connect. But Nandha Periyasamy can be lauded for taking up a movie with a good message." Siby Jeyya of India Herald called, "The film follows Routine Family Drama Template."

References

External links 
 

2021 action drama films